F-Secure Corporation is a global cyber security and privacy company, which has its headquarters in Helsinki, Finland.

The company has offices in Denmark, Finland, France, Germany, India, Italy, Japan, Malaysia, Netherlands, Norway, Poland, Sweden, the United Kingdom and the United States, with a presence in more than 100 countries, and Security Lab operations in Helsinki and in Kuala Lumpur, Malaysia.

F-Secure develops and sells antivirus, VPN, password management, and other consumer cyber security products and services for computers, mobile devices, smart TVs and internet of things devices. The company also offers several free-to-use tools on its website.

History
F-Secure was first established under the name Data Fellows by Petri Allas and Risto Siilasmaa on May 16, 1988. Data Fellows trained computer users and built customized databases. Three years later, the company launched its first major software project and developed the first heuristic scanner for antivirus products. F-Secure’s first antivirus product for Windows PCs was launched in 1994. Data Fellows became F-Secure in 1999. F-Secure was the first company that developed an anti-rootkit technology called BlackLight in 2005.

In June 2015, F-Secure expanded into the enterprise market by acquiring nSense, a Danish company that specializes in security consultation and vulnerability assessment. The purchase of Inverse Path, a privately owned Italian security consultancy with experience in avionics, automative, and industrial control sectors.

F-Secure Client Security received AV-TEST Best Protection award for the fifth time in 2016.

In June 2018, F-Secure acquired security company MWR InfoSecurity for 80 million pounds ($106 million). F-Secure gained the MWR consulting business (now F-Secure Consulting), its threat hunting product, Countercept (now F-Secure Managed Detection and Response), and its suite of phishing protection services, phishd.   

February 17th 2022, F-Secure announced a demerger of its corporate and consumer businesses. In conjunction with the demerger, the company was renamed as WithSecure Corporation (“WithSecure”). The consumer security business was to be transferred into a new independent company and continue using the name F-Secure Corporation. The demerger came into effect July 1st, 2022, when F-Secure was listed to Nasdaq Helsinki and the corporate business was completely separated from the company.

Academia
In co-operation with Aalto University School of Science and Technology, F-Secure runs a one-semester course for future virus analysts, with some material available online.

Controversies
After the media coverage of Magic Lantern and claims by some AV vendors to purposely leave a backdoor for it in their products, F-Secure announced their policy on detecting these spying programs:

"F-Secure Corporation would like to make known that we will not leave such backdoors to our F-Secure Anti-Virus products, regardless of the source of such tools. We have to draw a line with every sample we get regarding whether to detect it or not. This decision-making is influenced only by technical factors, and nothing else, but within the applicable laws and regulations, in our case meaning EU laws.

"We will also be adding detection of any program we see that might be used for terrorist activity or to benefit organized crime. We would like to state this for the record, as we have received queries regarding whether we would have the guts to detect something obviously made by a known violent mafia or terrorist organization. Yes we would."

See also

 Internet security
 Comparison of antivirus software
 Comparison of computer viruses

References

External links
 

Antivirus software
Software companies established in 1988
Software companies of Finland
Companies based in Helsinki
Companies listed on Nasdaq Helsinki
Computer security software companies
Security software
Finnish brands